Emerson Paul Haynes (March 10, 1918 - May 30, 1988) was second bishop of the Episcopal Diocese of Southwest Florida, serving from 1975 to 1988.

Early life and education
Haynes was born on March 10, 1918, in Marshfield, Indiana, the son of the Reverend Ora Wilbur Haynes and Lydia Pearl Walsh. He attended the local high school in New Albany, Indiana. At the age of 17, on November 15, 1935, he married Helen Charlene Elledge and together had three children. He then studied at the Indiana Central University and graduated with a Bachelor of Arts in 1942. The same university awarded him a Doctor of Humane Letters in 1976. He also attended the Bonebrake Theological Seminary and earned his Bachelor of Divinity in 1946.

Ordained ministry
Haynes was ordained a minister in the Evangelical United Brethren Church in 1937. He joined the Episcopal Church, and was ordained deacon in April 1948 and priest on September 30, 1948 by Bishop Henry Hobson of Southern Ohio. He served as rector of Holy Trinity Church in Cincinnati from 1948 till 1953. In 1953, he became rector of All Saints Church in Portsmouth, Ohio, while in 1957, he transferred to Calvary Church in Cincinnati to serve as its rector. In 1959 he became canon chancellor of St Luke's Cathedral in Orlando, Florida, and in 1964, he became rector of St Luke's Church in Fort Myers, Florida. He served on the Standing Committee and Diocesan Council and as Deputy to the Provincial Synod and General Conventions of 1970 and 1973.

Episcopacy
On April 27, 1974, Hayes was elected Coadjutor Bishop of Southwest Florida on the ninth ballot, during a diocesan convention. He was consecrated on September 21, 1974, by Presiding Bishop John Allin, in St Peter's Cathedral, St. Petersburg, Florida. He succeeded as diocesan bishop upon the retirement of Bishop Hargrave on July 31, 1975. Haynes died in office on May 30, 1988 in St Anthony's Hospital, St. Petersburg, Florida after suffering a bleeding gastric ulcer, followed by a heart attack.

References

1918 births
1988 deaths
People from Warren County, Indiana
University of Indianapolis alumni
United Theological Seminary alumni
Converts to Anglicanism
20th-century American Episcopalians
Episcopal bishops of Southwest Florida
20th-century American clergy